was a Japanese samurai of the Azuchi-Momoyama period, who served the Oda clan. He ruled Kaganoi Castle. During the Battle of Komaki and Nagakute, Shigemochi fought under his father Shigemune, who was attached to the forces of Oda Nobukatsu. Soon after, Kaganoi Castle was surrounded by the forces of Toyotomi Hideyoshi; Shigemune surrendered, and Shigemochi was employed by Hideyoshi as a messenger, receiving a stipend of 10,000 koku. He also possessed a blade made by Muramasa, which Hideyoshi bestowed on him in 1598.

In 1600, 27 August, a few days before the Battle of Sekigahara, Shigemochi was at a drinking party with Mizuno Tadashige and Horio Yoshiharu. Shigemochi killed Tadashige in a drunken rage, and was himself promptly killed by Yoshiharu. This worked to Tokugawa Ieyasu's favor, as Shigemochi (whose territory was in the path of Ieyasu's planned march) was close to Ishida Mitsunari. With Shigemochi's death, the Kaganoi family line became extinct.

Notes

 https://web.archive.org/web/20081012073920/http://wolfpac.press.ne.jp/daimyo02.html (5 August 2008)

Samurai
1561 births
1600 deaths
Daimyo